The pigmouth carp (Labeo kontius) is a cyprinid, benthopelagic, tropical fish found in India.

References 

Labeo
Fish described in 1849
Fish of India